Paolo Roberto (born 3 February 1969) is a Swedish ex-boxer, actor, and former TV host of partial Italian descent.

Boxing career
Roberto was born in Upplands Väsby, Stockholms län. He started to compete professionally at the age of 24, but had earlier competed in kickboxing where he became Swedish champion, and before that Taekwondo where he became Nordic champion and repeated Swedish champion. He was known for fighting a lot in the street.

He started off his career with four consecutive victories before running into trouble. After fighting a six-round draw against Roy Dehara he came back to the ring to be stopped in the second round against John Duckworth. His coach said in a post fight interview that Paolo refused to give up and that's probably why the referee stopped the fight. When asked about the incident Paolo simply said if he would give up in a street fight he would die. After his first loss he won fifteen straight fights before taking on the WBC light middleweight champion Javier Castillejo to whom he lost in the fifth round by referee stoppage. Roberto was behind on all scorecards at the time the fight was stopped.

Roberto then moved up in weight to challenge fellow countryman Armand Krajnc for his WBO middle weight title. In between those fights he had four wins. In the fight against Krajnc Roberto had the champion rocking on his feet in the opening round. A right hook stunned his opponent and he had to cover up against the ropes. Then later on in the fight Krajnc finally figured out his opponent and outboxed the smaller challenger.

Roberto then went back to his original weight class welterweight where after three fights he won the vacant WBC International Welterweight title against Raul Eduardo Bejarano. He then vacated his belt to fight for the WBO Inter-Continental welterweight title against Wayne Martell. Roberto dominated the fight and was winning when in the tenth round Martell's cut above his eye had gotten so bad the ring doctor decided he had had enough. In his first defense of his WBO title Roberto got knocked out in the second round against Sebastian Andres Lujan. He never fought professionally again.

All of Roberto's boxing matches took place outside of Sweden, including his championship fights, which were held in Åland, because pro boxing has been banned in Sweden since 1969.

Outside boxing
He was a participant in the first season of Let's Dance, the Swedish version of Dancing with the Stars.

He married Lena Arrelöv on 31 December 2003. The couple have one son, Enzo Antonio Roberto, born in 2004, and one daughter, Elisa Roberto, born in 2007. Roberto and Arrelöv divorced in 2012. His early life is dramatized in the 1987 Swedish movie Stockholmsnatt. He is featured in some chapters of Stieg Larsson's The Girl Who Played with Fire and played himself in the film based on the book.

Roberto has also talked openly of his conversion experience, which happened on a visit to St. Peter's in Rome. Wishing to approach the image of St. Michael the Archangel (the great "fighter" of the Heavenly Host), he was told he was not allowed in that roped off area. He asked, "Well, why can those people go in?" "They are going to confession," the guard replied. He thought of the empty life he had lived to his present, and told the guard, "Well, I'm going to confession, too." After over an hour with the priest, he said he felt renewed. The girl he had travelled to Rome with is now his wife, Lena Arrelöv. Roberto recounted this episode of his life to Marcus Grodi on the "Journey Home" show of EWTN.

Scandals 
In 2017, Roberto was criticized in the press for allegedly making sexist jokes on social media, one of which was in connection with Metoo. After criticism from, among others, Gudrun Schyman, Roberto defended himself with the fact that it was a joke and sexually-abusive acts are truly terrible.

In May 2020, he was arrested on suspicion of buying sex from a young woman from another European country. The strike was made in an apartment in central Stockholm in a police operation. Roberto confirmed the sex purchase during a television interview. In connection, he was dismissed from his program manager assignments on TV4 and dropped by the company representing his selling of Italian Food range Paolos.

Professional boxing record

Minor titles held

References

External links

1969 births
Swedish people of Italian descent
Swedish Roman Catholics
Living people
People from Upplands Väsby Municipality
Swedish male boxers
Welterweight boxers
Sportspeople from Stockholm County